XHJA-FM is a radio station on 102.5 FM in Xalapa, Veracruz. It is owned by Avanradio and is known as La Neta.

History
XEJA-AM 1400 received its concession on December 11, 1941. It was owned by Daniel Schacht Pérez. By the 1960s, it was owned by its current concessionaire and broadcast on 610 kHz.

References

External links
La Neta 102.5 Facebook

Radio stations in Veracruz
Radio stations established in 1941